The Prague Biennale is an international art exhibition in Prague, Czech Republic, held in alternate (odd-numbered) years. It was founded in 2003 by Helena Kontova and Giancarlo Politi. It is supported by the Czech Minister of Culture and the City of Prague. The New York Times said of it in 2009: "Now in its fourth iteration, the biennial has a reputation for working on the cheap (the lighting is minimal to nonexistent, meaning viewings have to end by sundown) and for offering the first appearance of emerging artists from Central and Eastern Europe."

The Prague Biennale is a partner organisation of the Biennial Foundation.

Biennales

1. 2003
The first Prague Biennale had the title "Peripheries become the center" and took place from 26 June to 24 August at the National Gallery in Prague's Veletrzni Palac.

2. 2005
The second biennale took place from 26 May to 15 September at the Karlin Hall.

3. 2007
The third biennale took place from 24 May to 16 September at the Karlin Hall.

4. 2009
The fourth biennale took place from 14 May to 26 July at the Karlin Hall and was one of the events of the Czech Presidency of the European Union.

5. 2011
The fifth biennale took place from 19 May to 11 September at the new venue of Microna.

6. 2013
The 6th Prague Biennale opened at the Žižkov freight railway station in Prague on 6 June.

References

External links

Art biennials
Recurring events established in 2003
Contemporary art exhibitions
Art exhibitions in the Czech Republic
Summer events in the Czech Republic